Pehong Chen (born 1957) is a Taiwanese-American businessman who co-founded Gain Technology with his Ph.D. advisor Michael A. Harrison and went on to found  BroadVision.  He currently serves as chairman of the board, president and chief executive officer of BroadVision.  Bloomberg Businessweek included Chen in a list of the "World's Most Successful Immigrants."

Chen was born in Taiwan in 1957 and earned a Ph.D in computer science from the University of California, Berkeley.

He founded BroadVision in 1993, an e-commerce company that helped companies create storefronts on the web.  During the Internet technology heyday of the late 1990s, Businessweek described his efforts at BroadVision as doing for "electronic commerce what McDonald's Corp.'s Ray Kroc was to hamburgers."

Awards
- 1999 EY Entrepreneur of the Year Award Recipient, Northern California Region

References

External links
LinkedIn profile

1957 births
American computer businesspeople
American technology chief executives
American people of Chinese descent
Living people
Taiwanese emigrants to the United States
UC Berkeley College of Engineering alumni
Sina Corp people